Jingxi Circuit or Jingxi Province was one of the major circuits during the Song dynasty. In 1072 it was divided into 2 circuits: Jingxi North Circuit and Jingxi South Circuit.

Its administrative area corresponds to roughly the modern provinces of southern Henan, northern Anhui, northern Hubei and eastern Shaanxi.

References
 

Circuits of the Song dynasty
Former circuits in Henan
Former circuits in Hubei
Former circuits in Anhui